The Unity connecting module, also known as Node 1, is the first U.S.-built component of the International Space Station (ISS). It connects the Russian and United States segments of the station, and is where crew eat meals together. 

The module is cylindrical in shape, with six berthing locations (forward, aft, port, starboard, zenith, and nadir) facilitating connections to other modules. Unity is the first of the three connecting modules; the other two are Harmony and Tranquility.

Launch and initial berthing 
Unity (with its two attached PMAs) was carried into orbit as the primary cargo of the Space Shuttle Endeavour (OV 105) on STS-88, the first Space Shuttle mission dedicated to assembly of the station. On 6 December 1998, the STS-88 crew mated the docking port of the PMA on the aft berthing port of Unity with the forward hatch of the already orbiting Zarya module. (Zarya was a mixed Russian-U.S. funded and Russian-built component launched a few days before aboard a Russian Proton launch vehicle from Baikonur, Kazakhstan.) This was the first connection made between two station modules.

Connecting modules and visiting vehicles 
Unity has two axial and four radial Common Berthing Mechanism (CBM) ports. In addition to connecting to the Zarya module, Unity connects to the U.S. Destiny Laboratory Module (added on STS-98), the Z1 truss (an early exterior framework for the station added on STS-92), the PMA-3 (also added on STS-92), and the Quest Joint Airlock (added on STS-104). During STS-120 the Harmony module was temporarily berthed to the port-side hatch of Unity. Tranquility, with its multi-windowed cupola, was attached to Unity'''s port side during the STS-130 mission, and Leonardo was added to the nadir hatch during STS-133.

In addition, the Leonardo and Raffaello Multi-Purpose Logistics Modules were each berthed to Unity on multiple missions. 

Nadir

Forward
Via PMA-2

Not via PMA-2 (Relocated to front of Destiny during STS-98 and again to the front of Harmony during STS-120.)

 Destiny, 2001–Present

Aft
 Zarya (via PMA-1), 1998–Present

Starboard
 Quest, 2001-Present

Port
 Tranquility, 2010-Present

Zenith
 Z1 truss, 2000-Present

 Details 

Essential space station resources such as fluids, environmental control and life support systems, electrical and data systems are routed through Unity to supply work and living areas of the station. More than 50,000 mechanical items, 216 lines to carry fluids and gases, and 121 internal and external electrical cables using six miles of wire were installed in the Unity node. The primary structure of Unity is constructed of aluminium. 

During the space station construction, a crew member placed two speed limit signs on the hatch (leading into the FGB) in 2003, noting the orbital velocity in mph and km/h.

Prior to its launch aboard Endeavour, conical Pressurized Mating Adapters (PMAs) were attached to the aft and forward berthing mechanisms of Unity. The adapters allow the docking systems used by the Space Shuttle and by Russian modules to attach to the node's hatches and berthing mechanisms. PMA-1 now permanently attaches Unity to Zarya, while PMA-2 provided a Shuttle docking port. Attached to the exterior of PMA-1 are computers, or multiplexer-demultiplexers (MDMs), which provided early command and control of Unity. Unity also is outfitted with an early communications system that allows data, voice and low data rate video with Mission Control Houston, to supplement Russian communications systems during the early station assembly activities. PMA-3 was attached to Unitys nadir berthing mechanism by the crew of STS-92.

 Other nodes 

The two remaining station connecting modules, or nodes, were manufactured in Italy by Alenia Aerospazio, as part of an agreement between NASA and the European Space Agency (ESA). In addition to their six berthing ports, each can hold eight International Standard Payload Racks (ISPRs). Unity, in comparison, holds just four ISPRs. ESA built Nodes 2 and 3 as partial payment for the launch aboard the Shuttle of the Columbus'' laboratory module, and other ESA equipment.

References

External links 
 NASA Facts: Unity Connecting Module: cornerstone for a Home in Orbit NASA, January 1999
 Expedition 15 - Tour of the Unity Node filmed in July 2007 by Clayton Anderson

Components of the International Space Station
Spacecraft launched in 1998